Sheikh Ahmad bin Mohammad bin Hasher Al Maktoum (أحمد بن محمد بن حشر آل مكتوم) (born 31 December 1963 in Dubai) is a shooter from the United Arab Emirates, who won the first ever Olympic medal for his country.

Sport career
At the 2004 Summer Olympics, he won the double trap event and finished fourth in the trap event.

At the 2005 ISSF World Cup, he won another gold medal in double trap.

He competed at the 2008 Summer Olympics, but did not reach the final in trap.

He subsequently began coaching young British shooter Peter Wilson, who would win the double trap event at the 2012 London Olympics.

References

External links 
 
 
 

1963 births
Living people
Emirati male sport shooters
Shooters at the 2000 Summer Olympics
Shooters at the 2004 Summer Olympics
Shooters at the 2008 Summer Olympics
Olympic gold medalists for the United Arab Emirates
Olympic shooters of the United Arab Emirates
Ahmad Mohammad Hasher
Trap and double trap shooters
Sportspeople from Dubai
Emirati hunters
Olympic medalists in shooting
Medalists at the 2004 Summer Olympics
Shooters at the 2002 Asian Games
Royal Olympic medalists
Asian Games competitors for the United Arab Emirates